The DuPage Dragons were a collegiate summer league baseball team located in Lisle, Illinois. The team played in the Prospect League, which their former league, the NCAA sanctioned Central Illinois Collegiate League, was absorbed into. The team was last managed by Travis Walden, a former pitching coach for Texas Tech.

History 

The Dragons were part of CICL league expansion in 2005 with the East Peoria Scrappers. The League long wanted a team located in the Chicago metro area.  While East Peoria folded after the 2005 season, DuPage had proven a successful addition to the league.

2005 Season 

The Dragons did not qualify for the postseason.

2006 Season 

The Dragons finished the 2006 season as the CICL Regular Season co-champions and qualified for the playoffs for the first time in franchise history. Dupage, the 2nd seed for the postseason, fell in the first round of the postseason to the 3rd-seeded Twin City Stars.

2007 season 

The 2007 campaign was a successful one. The Dragons won the rights to host the 2 game playoffs at the Benedictine University Ballpark by being in first place at the All-Star break. At the culmination of the season though, the Dragons finished with a 24–24 record, earning them the 3rd seed in the 4-team postseason tournament. The Dragons were able to win the semifinal game in 12 innings over the Quincy Gems, earning themselves a spot in the Championship Game. The Dragons season ended when they were defeated by the Regular Season Champions Dubois County Bombers in the Championship Game by a final score of 5–2.

2008 season 

Despite a 26-22 finish good for second place in the overall standings, the Dragons did not qualify for the playoffs because they did not win either the first-half title (won by the Springfield Sliders) or the second-half title (won by the Danville Dans).

2009 season 

The 2009 season will be the Dragons' first as a member of the Prospect League.

Drafted alumni 

A comprehensive list of all players taken in previous Major League Baseball drafts, who are currently playing professional baseball:

References

External links 
 DuPage Dragons

Amateur baseball teams in Illinois
Baseball teams established in 2005
Prospect League teams
Lisle, Illinois
Defunct baseball teams in Illinois
Baseball teams disestablished in 2011
2005 establishments in Illinois
2011 disestablishments in Illinois